Espadarana audax is a species of frog in the family Centrolenidae. It is found on the Amazonian versant of Andes in northeast Peru (San Martín Region), eastern Ecuador (Napo Province), and southern Colombia (Cauca and Putumayo Departments).

Taxonomy
The generic placement of what was originally described as Centrolenella audax in 1973 has long been uncertain, but in 2014 it was placed in the genus Espadarana. At the same time, Centrolene fernandoi was brought into synonymy with Espadarana audax.

Description
Adult males measure  in snout–vent length. The snout is truncate or round in lateral view. The texture of dorsal skin is shagreen and includes spinules and white warts. The toes have some webbing.

Habitat and conservation

Threats to this species, assessed at the time when Centrolene fernandoi was still recognized as a separate species, include habitat loss (deforestation from agriculture and logging) and chytridiomycosis.

References

Espadarana
Amphibians of the Andes
Amphibians of Colombia
Amphibians of Ecuador
Amphibians of Peru
Amphibians described in 1973
Taxa named by John Douglas Lynch
Taxa named by William Edward Duellman
Taxonomy articles created by Polbot